Monterey is an unincorporated community in Cuming County, Nebraska, United States.

History
A post office was established at Monterey in 1882, and remained in operation until it was discontinued in 1905. The town name commemorates the Battle of Monterrey in the Mexican–American War.

References

Populated places in Cuming County, Nebraska
Unincorporated communities in Nebraska